is a Japanese animation studio.

Productions

TV series

References

Japanese animation studios